In physics, and more specifically in Hamiltonian mechanics, a generating function is, loosely, a function whose partial derivatives generate the differential equations that determine a system's dynamics. Common examples are the partition function of statistical mechanics, the Hamiltonian, and the function which acts as a bridge between two sets of canonical variables when performing a canonical transformation.

In canonical transformations
There are four basic generating functions, summarized by the following table:

Example
Sometimes a given Hamiltonian can be turned into one that looks like the harmonic oscillator Hamiltonian, which is

For example, with the Hamiltonian

where p is the generalized momentum and q is the generalized coordinate, a good canonical transformation to choose would be

This turns the Hamiltonian into

which is in the form of the harmonic oscillator Hamiltonian.

The generating function F for this transformation is of the third kind,

To find F explicitly, use the equation for its derivative from the table above,

and substitute the expression for P from equation, expressed in terms of p and Q:

 

Integrating this with respect to Q results in an equation for the generating function of the transformation given by equation:
{|cellpadding="2" style="border:2px solid #ccccff"
|
|}

To confirm that this is the correct generating function, verify that it matches:

See also
Hamilton–Jacobi equation
Poisson bracket

References

Further reading 
 

Classical mechanics
Hamiltonian mechanics